HMS Tactician was an  destroyer, which served with the Royal Navy. Launched on 7 August 1918, the vessel entered service at the closing of the First World War. The ship joined the Fourteenth Destroyer Flotilla of the Grand Fleet but was placed in Reserve at Nore in 1919. Tactician deteriorated over the following years and was sold to be broken up on 5 February 1931 following the signing of the London Naval Treaty that limited the amount of destroyer tonnage that the Navy could retain.

Design and development

Tactician was one of thirty-three Admiralty  destroyers ordered by the British Admiralty in June 1917 as part of the Twelfth War Construction Programme. Differences with the R class were minor, such as having the searchlight moved aft.

Two funnels were fitted.

Armament consisted of three QF  Mk IV guns on the ship's centreline. One was mounted raised on the forecastle, one between the funnels on a platform and one aft. The ship also mounted a single  2-pounder pom-pom anti-aircraft gun for air defence. Four  tubes were fitted in two twin rotating mounts aft. The ship was designed to mount two  torpedo tubes either side of the superstructure but this addition required the forecastle plating to be cut away, making the boats very wet so they were removed. The weight saved enabled the heavier Mark V 21-inch torpedo to be carried. The ship had a complement of 90 officers and ratings.

Construction and career
Laid down on 21 November 1917 by William Beardmore and Company in Dalmuir with the yard number 589, Tactician was launched on 7 August 1918 and completed on 23 October 1918. The vessel was the first of the name. On commissioning, Tactician joined the Fourteenth Destroyer Flotilla of the Grand Fleet. The ship was allocated the pennant number G54.

With the First World War closing, the destroyer saw no action before the Armistice. At the end of the war, the ship remained with the Grand Fleet until it was dissolved. As the navy no longer required such a large active fleet of ships, Tactician was transferred to join sixty-three other destroyers in reserve at Nore.  On 22 April 1930, the United Kingdom signed the London Naval Treaty, which limited total destroyer tonnage in the Navy. Having remained on reserve for more than a decade, Tactician was found to be in poor condition and was one of those chosen to be retired. On 5 February 1931, the destroyer was sold to Metal Industries of Charlestown, Fife, and broken up. The ship's badge (displaying a chessboard and the word "Check-mate") was saved and used by the Western Approaches Tactical Unit in Liverpool.

References

Citations

Bibliography

 
 
 
 
 
 
 

1918 ships
S-class destroyers (1917) of the Royal Navy
Ships built on the River Clyde